Chavari is a village and a community in the municipal unit of Amaliada, Elis, Greece. The community consists of the villages Chavari, Pera Chavari and Agios Georgios. Chavari is 6 km northeast of Amaliada.

Person
Christos Laskaris, poet

Amaliada
Populated places in Elis